Volodymyr Semenovych Korolyuk (19 August 1925 – 4 April 2020) was a Ukrainian and Soviet mathematician who made significant contributions to probability theory and its applications, academician of the National Academy of Sciences of Ukraine (1976).

Korolyuk was born in Kyiv in August 1925. Between 1949 and 2005 Volodymyr Korolyuk published over 300 papers and 22 monographs. He died in Kyiv in April 2020 at the age of 94.

Awards and honors 

Volodymyr Korolyuk has been awarded a number of scientific prizes.

 Krylov Prize of the National Academy of Sciences of Ukraine, 1976
 State Prize of the Ukrainian Soviet Socialist Republic, 1978
 Glushkov Prize of the National Academy of Sciences of Ukraine, 1988
 Bogolyubov Prize of the National Academy of Sciences of Ukraine, 1995
 Ostrogradsky Medal, 2002
 State Prize of Ukraine, 2003

References 

 Biography at the website of the Kyiv Mathematical Society (in Ukrainian)
 Yu. A. Mitropolskiy, A. V. Skorokhod, D. V. Gusak, Vladimir Semenovich Korolyuk (in honor of 60th anniversary), Ukrainian Math. Journal, 37, No 4, 1985, pp 488–489 (in Russian)

1925 births
2020 deaths
20th-century  Ukrainian  mathematicians
Scientists from Kyiv
Laureates of the State Prize of Ukraine in Science and Technology